Andrew 'Howard' Payne (17 April 1931 – 1 March 1992) was an English Olympic track and field athlete. He specialised in the hammer throw event during his career.

Biography
Born in Benoni, Gauteng (South Africa), Payne represented Great Britain in three consecutive Olympic Games, starting in 1964. He previously competed for Southern Rhodesia at the 1958 British Empire and Commonwealth Games.

Payne claimed the gold medal for England in the men's hammer throw event at three consecutive Commonwealth Games in 1962, 1966 and the 1970 British Commonwealth Games in Edinburgh, Scotland. He also represented England and won a silver medal, at the 1974 British Commonwealth Games in Christchurch, New Zealand.

He died in Birmingham aged 60. Payne was at one time married to discus thrower Rosemary Payne.

Archives 
Archives of Howard Payne are held at the Cadbury Research Library, University of Birmingham.

References

1931 births
1992 deaths
People from Benoni
Rhodesian athletes
English male hammer throwers
British male hammer throwers
Olympic athletes of Great Britain
Athletes (track and field) at the 1964 Summer Olympics
Athletes (track and field) at the 1968 Summer Olympics
Athletes (track and field) at the 1972 Summer Olympics
Commonwealth Games competitors for Southern Rhodesia
Commonwealth Games gold medallists for England
Commonwealth Games silver medallists for England
Commonwealth Games medallists in athletics
Athletes (track and field) at the 1958 British Empire and Commonwealth Games
Athletes (track and field) at the 1962 British Empire and Commonwealth Games
Athletes (track and field) at the 1966 British Empire and Commonwealth Games
Athletes (track and field) at the 1970 British Commonwealth Games
Athletes (track and field) at the 1974 British Commonwealth Games
South African emigrants to Rhodesia
South African emigrants to the United Kingdom
South African people of British descent
White South African people
White Rhodesian people
Sportspeople from Gauteng
Medallists at the 1962 British Empire and Commonwealth Games
Medallists at the 1966 British Empire and Commonwealth Games
Medallists at the 1970 British Commonwealth Games
Medallists at the 1974 British Commonwealth Games